CalPac may refer to:

 CalPac (airline), a former division of Mesa Airlines
 California Pacific Conference, a U.S. collegiate sports conference located in California, affiliated with the National Association of Intercollegiate Athletics (NAIA)

See also
 California Pacific (disambiguation)
 Calpack, California
 Kalpak, a high-crowned cap